Çürüklü may refer to the following places in Turkey:

 Çürüklü, Dinar
 Çürüklü, Kozan